Charles John Hallahan (July 29, 1943 – November 25, 1997) was an American film, television, and stage actor. His films include Going in Style,  and Nightwing (1979), The Thing (1982), Twilight Zone: The Movie (1983), Vision Quest and Pale Rider (1985), Cast a Deadly Spell (1991), and Dante's Peak (1997). On television he appeared in The Rockford Files, Happy Days and Hawaii Five-O (all 1977), played Chet Wilke in Lou Grant (1979–1982), M* A* S* H and Hill Street Blues (1981), The Equalizer (1985), and as Capt. Charlie Devane in Hunter from 1986 to 1991.

Life and career
Hallahan was born in Philadelphia and grew up in Harrisburg and then Green Ridge, Delaware County. He was a student at St. James High School in Chester, leaving in 1961. He attended Rutgers University-Camden, graduating with a BA degree in 1968. He then continued fpr a masters degree earning an MFA from Temple University in 1971. 

He served three years in the US Navy in the early 1960s, including time as a Navy hospital corpsman. He moved to Los Angeles in 1977.

Career
Hallalhan was a member of the American Conservatory Theater and appeared in many productions there such as One Flew Over the Cuckoo’s Nest, Equus, and The Threepenny Opera. In 1977, Hallahan was a founding member of The Matrix Theatre Company in Los Angeles. performing in plays like Endgame (play) and The Seagull, and Robert Schenkkan's play, The Kentucky Cycle.

On screen, Hallahan has played Chet Wilke in Lou Grant (1979–1982). In 1982, he portrayed geologist Vance Norris in the remake of The Thing alongside Kurt Russell. He starred as LAPD Captain Charlie Devane on Hunter. He portrayed the nameless "Coach" in Vision Quest, opposite Matthew Modine. Hallahan also co-starred as a regular cast member in two popular television series, Grace Under Fire and the long-running The Paper Chase. 

One of his final film roles was his portrayal of volcanologist Dr. Paul Dreyfus in the 1997 disaster-thriller film Dante's Peak, which also starred Pierce Brosnan and Linda Hamilton. In 1997, Hallahan was cast as Liam Bilby for the Star Trek: Deep Space Nine'' episode "Honor Among Thieves".

Death
On November 25, 1997, he died of an apparent heart attack while driving his car in Los Angeles. He left behind his wife Barbera, 2 sons Seamus and Liam, and three brothers, Michael, Kenneth and Lawrence. His brother, Fr. Kenneth Hallahan, was a Roman Catholic priest in New Jersey.

Filmography

Film

Television

See also
 Back Stage West Garland Awards, first annual awards dedicated honor to Hallahan

References

External links

1943 births
1997 deaths
American male film actors
American male television actors
Back Stage West Garland Award recipients
Male actors from Philadelphia
Temple University alumni
United States Navy sailors
20th-century American male actors
Rutgers University–Camden alumni